= Clara Bonanad =

Spanish researcher

Clara Bonanad en una charla magistral sobre cardiología

Clara Bonanad en el hospital

Clara Bonanad entrando a su consulta de cardiología

Clara Bonanad en su consulta de cardiología

Clara Bonanad Lozano is a Spanish cardiologist, cardiovascular researcher and associate professor. She is a research cardiologist at the INCLIVA Health Research Institute in Valencia and an associate professor in the Department of Medicine at the University of Valencia. Her clinical and scientific work focuses on geriatric cardiology, acute coronary syndromes, ischaemic heart disease, heart failure, cardiorenal disease, frailty, inflammation, immunothrombosis, residual cardiovascular risk and cardiac imaging.

Bonanad has held leadership roles in Spanish and Valencian cardiovascular societies, including president of the Geriatric Cardiology Section of the Spanish Society of Cardiology and president of the Ischaemic Heart Disease, ECG and Exercise Physiology Section of the Valencian Society of Cardiology. For the 2026-2028 term, she serves as vice-president for Valencia of the Valencian Society of Cardiology, and for the 2024-2026 term she is a member of the Clinical Cardiology Association of the Spanish Society of Cardiology.

Since 2013, Bonanad has delivered more than 300 scientific lectures at regional, national and international meetings, including conferences and educational activities held in Europe, Latin America, North America, the Middle East and Asia, both in person and online.

== Education and training ==
Bonanad graduated in Medicine and Surgery from the University of Valencia in 2007. She completed a doctoral programme in Preventive Medicine and Public Health at the same university and obtained her PhD in 2016 with the thesis Impacto Pronóstico de los Síndromes Geriátricos en Pacientes Ancianos con Síndrome Coronario Agudo, supervised by Juan Sanchís Forés and co-supervised by Vicente Ruiz. The thesis was awarded sobresaliente cum laude.

Her postgraduate training includes master's degrees and postgraduate programmes in acute cardiac care, cardiac imaging, advances in cardiology, clinical unit management and applications of artificial intelligence in healthcare. She has advanced competence in Catalan, English and French.

== Research and career ==
Bonanad completed her cardiology residency at the University Clinical Hospital of Valencia between 2008 and 2013. She subsequently worked as a specialist in cardiology, combining clinical practice with biomedical research. She held a Río Hortega postdoctoral contract from 2014 to 2016 and a Juan Rodés contract from 2022 to 2026.

At INCLIVA, Bonanad is linked to the Translational Research Group in Ischaemic Heart Disease and leads research activity in geriatric cardiology, immunothrombosis and cardiac rehabilitation. Her research has addressed frailty and geriatric syndromes in acute coronary syndromes, cardiac magnetic resonance after myocardial infarction, chronic coronary syndrome, heart failure, cardiorenal disease, hyperkalaemia, iron deficiency, inflammation and cardiovascular prevention.

She has also participated in national and international clinical trials and collaborative registries in heart failure, ischaemic heart disease, lipid disorders and cardiovascular risk. In addition, she was editor of the Spanish Heart Foundation Magazine from 2024 to 2025 and has participated in editorial activities for scientific journals including Journal of Clinical Medicine and Frontiers.

== Areas of expertise ==
Bonanad's areas of expertise include clinical cardiology, geriatric cardiology, cardiovascular research and the management of complex cardiovascular disease in older adults. Her work has focused on acute coronary syndromes, heart failure, atrial fibrillation, myocardial infarction, cardiovascular prevention, antithrombotic and anticoagulant therapy, cardiac amyloidosis, cardiovascular imaging and risk-factor control in patients with comorbidities such as diabetes, obesity, dyslipidaemia and frailty.

Her academic and translational research interests include immunothrombosis, lipidomics, biomarkers, cardiac rehabilitation after acute coronary syndrome and the early detection of cardiovascular disease.

== Scientific societies and leadership roles ==
- Spanish Society of Cardiology: president of the Geriatric Cardiology Section for the 2019–2021 term.
- Spanish Society of Cardiology: president-elect of the Clinical Cardiology Association for the 2024–2026 term.
- Spanish Society of Cardiology: member of the Clinical Cardiology Association.
- Spanish Society of Cardiology: member of the Women and Heart Committee from November 2023.
- Valencian Society of Cardiology: president of the Ischaemic Heart Disease, ECG and Exercise Physiology Section.
- Valencian Society of Cardiology: vice-president for Valencia for the 2026–2028 term.
- Member of Spanish Society of Cardiology groups related to cardiopulmonary resuscitation, simulation, tutors and residents.

== Publications ==
- Coronavirus: la emergencia geriátrica de 2020 |trans-title=Coronavirus: the geriatric emergency of 2020.
- CA125-guided diuretic treatment versus usual care in patients with acute heart failure and renal dysfunction.
- Frailty and hospitalization burden in patients with chronic heart failure.
- Effect of dapagliflozin on quality of life of patients with aortic stenosis undergoing transcatheter aortic valve implantation.
- Clinical predictors and prognosis of myocardial infarction with non-obstructive coronary arteries without ST-segment elevation in older adults.
- Sex-related differences in heart failure diagnosis.
- Comments on the 2021 ESC guidelines on cardiovascular disease prevention in clinical practice.
- Consensus document on palliative care in cardiorenal patients.
- Interdisciplinary recommendations for recurrent hyperkalaemia: insights from the GUARDIAN-HK European Steering Committee.
- Sex differences in the impact of frailty in elderly outpatients with heart failure.
- Infective Endocarditis in the Elderly: Challenges and Strategies.
- Cardiovascular prevention in elderly patients.
- Antithrombotic Therapy in Elderly Patients with Acute Coronary Syndromes.
- Evaluation of the Use of Dual Antiplatelet Therapy beyond the First Year after Acute Coronary Syndrome&quot;.
- Manual de bolsillo de diagnóstico y manejo de amiloidosis en el paciente mayor.
- Manual valoración geriátrica del paciente mayor con cardiopatía.
